Manea Mohammed (Arabic:مانع محمد) (born 19 June 1989) is an Emirati footballer who plays as a right back.

References

External links
 

Emirati footballers
1989 births
Living people
Fujairah FC players
Al Shabab Al Arabi Club Dubai players
Shabab Al-Ahli Club players
Al Wahda FC players
UAE First Division League players
UAE Pro League players
Association football fullbacks